

The Bleriot-SPAD S.39 was a French carrier-borne reconnaissance aircraft built in the early 1920s.

Design
The S.39 was a biplane with monocoque fuselage and wood and canvas wings. The undercarriage featured a hydroplane / flotation device.

Specifications

See also

References

SPAD aircraft
Biplanes
Single-engined tractor aircraft
Aircraft first flown in 1921